Wheat allergy is an allergy to wheat which typically presents itself as a food allergy, but can also be a contact allergy resulting from occupational exposure. Like all allergies, wheat allergy involves immunoglobulin E and mast cell response.  Typically the allergy is limited to the seed storage proteins of wheat. Some reactions are restricted to wheat proteins, while others can react across many varieties of seeds and other plant tissues. Wheat allergy is rare.  Prevalence in adults was found to be 0.21% in a 2012 study in Japan.  

Wheat allergy may be a misnomer since there are many allergenic components in wheat, for example serine protease inhibitors, glutelins and prolamins and different responses are often attributed to different proteins. Twenty-seven potential wheat allergens have been successfully identified. The most severe response is exercise/aspirin induced anaphylaxis attributed to one omega gliadin that is a relative of the protein that causes celiac disease. Other more common symptoms include nausea, urticaria, and atopy.

Gluten sensitivity and Coeliac disease are two different diseases even if the management could be similar. Management of wheat allergy consists of complete withdrawal of any food containing wheat and other gluten-containing cereals (gluten-free diet).

Types of allergens
There are four major classes of seed storage proteins: albumins, globulins, prolamins and glutelins. Within wheat, prolamins are called gliadins and glutelins are called glutenins. These two protein groups form the classic glutens. While gluten is also the causative agent of celiac disease (CD), celiac disease can be contrasted to gluten allergy by the involvement of different immune cells and antibody types (See Comparative pathophysiology of gluten sensitivities), and because the list of allergens extend beyond the classic gluten category of proteins.

Gluten allergy

Prolamin allergies
Prolamins and the closely related glutelins, a recent study in Japan found that glutenins are a more frequent allergen, however gliadins are associated with the most severe disease.  A proteomics based study found a γ-gliadin isoform gene.

Glutelin allergies
Glutenin (wheat glutelin) is a predominant allergen in wheat. Nine subunits of LMW-glutenin have been linked in connection with wheat allergies.

Albumin and globulin allergy
At present many of the allergens of wheat have not been characterized; however, the early studies found many to be in the albumin class. A recent study in Europe confirmed the increased presence of allergies to amylase/trypsin inhibitors (serpins) and lipid transfer protein (LPT),  but less reactivity to the globulin fraction. The allergies tend to differ between populations (Italian, Japanese, Danish or Swiss), indicating a potential genetic component to these reactivities.

Other allergies

Wheat pollen and grass allergies
Respiratory allergies are an occupational disease that develop in food service workers. Previous studies detected 40 allergens from wheat; some cross-reacted with rye proteins and a few cross-reacted with grass pollens. A later study showed that baker's allergy extend over a broad range of cereal grasses (wheat, durum wheat, triticale, cereal rye, barley, rye grass, oats, canary grass, rice, maize, sorghum and Johnson grass) though the greatest similarities were seen between wheat and rye, and that these allergies show cross reactivity between seed proteins and pollen proteins, including a prominent crossreactivity between the common environment rye pollen and wheat gluten.

Derivative allergies
Proteins are made of a chain of dehydrated amino acids. When enzymes cut proteins into pieces they add water back to the site at which they cut, called enzymatic hydrolysis, for proteins it is called proteolysis. 
The initial products of this hydrolysis are polypeptides, and smaller products are called simply peptides; these are called wheat protein hydrolysates. These hydrolysates can create allergens out of wheat proteins that previously did not exist by the exposure of buried antigenic sites in the proteins.

When proteins are cut into polypeptides, buried regions are exposed to the surface, and these buried regions may possibly be antigenic. Such hydrolyzed wheat protein is used as an additive in foods and cosmetics. The peptides are often 1 kD in size (9 amino acid residues in length) and may increase the allergic response. These wheat polypeptides can cause immediate contact urticaria in susceptible people.

Signs and symptoms
Wheat allergies are not altogether different from other food allergies or respiratory allergies. However two conditions, exercise/aspirin induced anaphylaxis and urticaria, occur more frequently with wheat allergies.

Common symptoms of a wheat allergy include eczema (atopic dermatitis), hives (urticaria), asthma, "hay fever" (allergic rhinitis), angioedema (tissue swelling due to fluid leakage from blood vessels), abdominal cramps, nausea, and vomiting. Rarer symptoms include  anaphylactic shock, anxiety, arthritis, bloated stomach, chest pains, depression or mood swings, diarrhea, dizziness, headache, joint and muscle aches and pains (may be associated with progressive arthritis), palpitations, psoriasis, irritable bowel syndrome (IBS), swollen throat or tongue, tiredness and lethargy, and unexplained cough.

Reactions may become more severe with repeated exposure.

Asthma, anaphylaxis, nasal allergies

Exercise-induced anaphylaxis

Wheat gliadins and potentially oat avenins are associated with another disease, known as wheat-dependent exercise induced anaphylaxis (WDEIA) which is similar to baker's allergy as both are mediated by IgE responses. In WDEIA, however, the ω-gliadins or a high molecular weight glutenin subunit, and similar proteins in other Triticeae genera, enter the blood stream during exercise where they cause acute asthmatic or allergic reaction. Wheat may specifically induce WDEIA and certain chronic urticaria because the anti-gliadin IgE detects ω5-gliadins expressed by most of the Gli-B1 alleles, but prolamins extracted from rye or wheat/rye translocates invoke almost no responses. The Gli-B1 gene in wheat, Triticum aestivum, comes from the progenitor species Aegilops speltoides. This indicates that nascent mutations on the B genome of wheat are from a small number of cultivated Triticeae species.

Baker's allergy
Baker's allergy has a ω-gliadin component and thioredoxin hB component. In addition, a gluten-extrinsic allergen has been identified as aspergillus amylase, added to flour to increase its baking properties.

Urticaria, atopy, eczema
Contact sensitivity, atopic dermatitis, eczema, and urticaria appear to be related phenomena, the cause of which is generally believed to be the hydrophobic prolamin components of certain Triticeae, Aveneae cultivars. In wheat one of these proteins is ω-gliadin (Gli-B1 gene product). A study of mothers and infants on an allergen-free diet demonstrated that these conditions can be avoided if wheat sensitive cohort in the population avoid wheat in the first year of life. As with exercise induced anaphylaxis, aspirin (also: tartrazine, sodium benzoate, sodium glutamate (MSG),  sodium metabisulfite, tyramine) may be sensitizing factors for reactivity. Studies of the wheat-dependent exercise induced anaphylaxis demonstrate that atopy and EIA can be triggered from the ingestion of that aspirin and probably NSAIDs allow the entry of wheat proteins into the blood, where IgE reacts within allergens in the dermal tissues. Some individuals may be so sensitive that low dose aspirin therapy can increase risk for both atopy and WDEIA.

Wheat allergies were also common with contact dermatitis. A primary cause was the donning agent used for latex gloves prior to the 1990s, however most gloves now use protein free starch as a donning agent.

Rheumatoid arthritis 
There appears to be an association of rheumatoid arthritis (RA) both with gluten sensitive enteropathy (GSE) and gluten allergies. RA in GSE/CD may be secondary to tissue transglutaminase (tTG) autoimmunity. In a recent study in Turkey, 8 of 20 RA patients had wheat reactivities on the radioallergosorbent test (RAST). When this allergic food and all other patient specific RAST+ foods were removed half of the patients had improved RA by serological markers. In patients with wheat allergies, rye was effectively substituted. This may indicate that some proportion of RA in GSE/CD is due to downstream effects of allergic responses. In addition, cross-reactive anti-beef-collagen antibodies (IgG) may explain some rheumatoid arthritis (RA) incidences.

Neuropathies
Migraines. In the late 1970s it was reported that people with migraines had reactions to food allergens, like RA, the most common reaction was to wheat (78%), orange, eggs, tea, coffee, chocolate, milk, beef, corn, cane sugar, and yeast. When 10 foods causing the most reactions were removed migraines fell precipitously, hypertension declined. Some specific instances are attributed to wheat.

Autism. Parents of children with autism often ascribe the children's gastrointestinal symptoms to allergies to wheat and other foods. The published data on this approach are sparse, with the only double-blind study reporting negative results.

Diagnosis
Diagnoses of wheat allergy may deserve special consideration.  Omega-5 gliadin, the most potent wheat allergen, cannot be detected in whole wheat preparations; it must be extracted and partially digested (similar to how it degrades in the intestine) to reach full activity. Other studies show that digestion of wheat proteins to about 10 amino acids can increase the allergic response 10 fold. Certain allergy tests may not be suitable to detect all wheat allergies, resulting in cryptic allergies. Because many of the symptoms associated with wheat allergies, such as eczema and asthma, may be related or unrelated to a wheat allergy, medical deduction can be an effective way of determining the cause. If symptoms are alleviated by immunosuppressant drugs, such as Prednisone, an allergy-related cause is likely.  If multiple symptoms associated with wheat allergies are present in the absence of immunosuppressants then a wheat allergy is probable.

Prevention

Management of wheat allergy consists of complete withdrawal of any food containing wheat and other gluten-containing cereals (gluten-free diet). Nevertheless, some patients can tolerate barley, rye or oats.

In people with less severe forms of wheat-dependent exercise induced anaphylaxis (WDEIA), may be enough completely avoiding wheat consumption before exercise and other cofactors that trigger disease symptoms, such as nonsteroidal anti-inflammatory drugs and alcohol.

Wheat is often a cryptic contaminant of many foods; more obvious items are bread crumbs, maltodextrin, bran, cereal extract, couscous, cracker meal, enriched flour, gluten, high-gluten flour, high-protein flour, seitan, semolina wheat, vital gluten, wheat bran, wheat germ, wheat gluten, wheat malt, wheat starch or whole wheat flour. Less obvious sources of wheat could be gelatinized starch, hydrolyzed vegetable protein, modified food starch, modified starch, natural flavoring, soy sauce, soy bean paste, hoisin sauce, starch, vegetable gum, specifically beta-glucan, vegetable starch.

Alternative cereals
Triticeae gluten-free oats (free of wheat, rye or barley) may be a useful source of cereal fiber. Some wheat allergies allow the use of rye bread as a substitute. Rice flour is a commonly used alternative for those allergic to wheat.  Wheat-free millet flour, buckwheat, flax seed meal, corn meal, quinoa flour, chia seed flour, tapioca starch or flour, and others can be used as substitutes.

Treatment

Treatment for accidental ingestion of wheat products by allergic individuals varies depending on the sensitivity of the person. An antihistamine such as diphenhydramine may be prescribed. Sometimes prednisone will be prescribed to prevent a possible late phase Type I hypersensitivity reaction. Severe allergic reactions (anaphalaxis) may require treatment with an epinephrine pen, which is an injection device designed to be used by a non-healthcare professional when emergency treatment is warranted.

See also
 Allergy (has diagrams showing involvement of different types of white blood cells)
 Food allergy (has images of hives, skin prick test and patch test)
 List of allergens (food and non-food)
 Gluten immunochemistry

References

External links 

Food allergies
Allergy